Hebburn Comprehensive School is a coeducational secondary school located in Hebburn, Tyne and Wear, England, with pupils aged from 11 to 16.

The school was previously awarded specialist status as a Maths and Computing College. In the spring of 2010, the school began a complete refurbishment as part of the Building Schools for the Future programme that was completed in April 2012. The school now has features such as the Atrium and new IT facilities. Also, later on in the year, the Music block containing the LRC, Music Department and the Main Hall were refurbished.

Hebburn Comprehensive School offers GCSEs and NCFE Technical awards as programmes of study for pupils.

References

External links 
 Official website

Secondary schools in the Metropolitan Borough of South Tyneside
Community schools in the Metropolitan Borough of South Tyneside